Donald Patrick Conroy (October 26, 1945 – March 4, 2016) was an American author who wrote several acclaimed novels and memoirs; his books The Water is Wide, The Lords of Discipline, The Prince of Tides and The Great Santini were made into films, the last two being nominated for Oscars. He is recognized as a leading figure of late-20th-century Southern literature.

Early life
Born in Atlanta, Georgia, he was the eldest of seven children (five boys and two girls) born to Marine Colonel Donald Conroy, of Chicago, Illinois, and the former Frances "Peggy" Peek of Alabama. His father was a Marine Corps fighter pilot, and Conroy moved often in his youth, attending 11 schools by the time he was 15. He did not have a hometown until his family settled in Beaufort, South Carolina, where he finished high school. During his senior year in high school, he was a protégé of Ann Head who was an influence on his future writing. His alma mater is The Citadel, The Military College of South Carolina in Charleston, where he graduated from the Corps of Cadets portion as an English major.

Conroy had said his stories were heavily influenced by his military brat upbringing, and in particular, difficulties experienced with his own father, a US Marine Corps pilot, who was physically and emotionally abusive toward his children. The pain of a youth growing up in such a harsh environment is evident in Conroy's novels, which use autobiographical material, particularly The Great Santini and The Prince of Tides. While living in Orlando, Florida, Conroy's fifth-grade basketball team defeated a team of sixth graders, making the sport his prime outlet for bottled-up emotions for more than a dozen years. Conroy also cites his family's frequent military-related moves and growing up immersed in military culture as significant influences in his life (in both positive and negative ways).

A standout athlete, he was recruited to The Citadel to play basketball; his 2002 book My Losing Season focused on his experiences playing his senior year, and like The Lords of Discipline, also served as a retrospective of his cadet years.

Writing career
As a graduate of The Citadel's Corps of Cadets, his experiences there provided the basis for two of his best-known works, the novel The Lords of Discipline and the memoir My Losing Season. The latter details his senior year on the school's underdog basketball team, which won the longest game in the history of Southern Conference basketball against rival Virginia Military Institute in quadruple overtime in 1967.

His first book, The Boo, is a collection of anecdotes about cadet life centering on Lt. Colonel Thomas Nugent Courvousie, who had served as Assistant Commandant of Cadets at The Citadel from 1961 to 1968; Courvoisie was the inspiration for the fictional character Colonel Thomas Berrineau, a.k.a. "The Bear", in The Lords Of Discipline. Conroy began the book in 1968, after learning that Lt. Colonel Courvoisie had been removed from his position as assistant commandant and given a job in the warehouse; he paid to self-publish the book, borrowing the money from a bank.

After graduating from The Citadel, Conroy taught English in Beaufort, South Carolina; while there he met and married Barbara Jones, a young widow of the Vietnam War who was pregnant with her second child. He then accepted a job teaching children in a one-room schoolhouse on remote Daufuskie Island, South Carolina. 
 
Conroy was fired at the conclusion of his first year on the island for his unconventional teaching practices, including his refusal to use corporal punishment on students, and for his lack of respect for the school's administration. He later wrote The Water Is Wide based on his experiences as a teacher. The book won Conroy a humanitarian award from the National Education Association and an Anisfield-Wolf Book Award. It was also made into a feature film, Conrack, starring Jon Voight in 1974. Hallmark produced a television version of the book in 2006.

In 1976, Conroy published his novel, The Great Santini. The main character of the novel is Marine fighter pilot Colonel "Bull" Meecham, who dominates and terrorizes his family. Bull Meecham also psychologically abuses his teenage son Ben. The character is based on Conroy's father Donald. (According to My Losing Season, Donald Conroy was even worse than the character depicted in Santini.)

The Great Santini caused friction within the Conroy family, who felt that he had betrayed family secrets by writing about his father. According to Conroy, members of his mother's family would picket his book signings, passing out pamphlets asking people not to buy the novel. The friction contributed to the failure of his first marriage. However, the book also eventually helped repair Conroy's relationship with his father, and they became very close. His father, looking to prove that he was not like the character in the book, changed his behavior drastically.

According to Conroy, his father would often sign copies of his son's novels, "I hope you enjoy my son's latest work of fiction." He would underline the word "fiction" five or six times. "That boy of mine sure has a vivid imagination. Ol' lovable, likable Col. Don Conroy, USMC (Ret.), the Great Santini." The novel was made into a film of the same name in 1979, starring Robert Duvall.

Publication of The Lords of Discipline in 1980 upset many of his fellow graduates of The Citadel, who felt that his portrayal of campus life was highly unflattering. The novel was adapted for the screenplay of a 1983 film of the same name, starring David Keith as Will McLean and Robert Prosky as Colonel "Bear" Berrineau. The rift was not healed until 2000, when Conroy was awarded an honorary degree and asked to deliver the commencement address the following year. In 1986, Conroy published The Prince of Tides about Tom Wingo, an unemployed South Carolina teacher who goes to New York City to help his sister, Savannah, a poet who has attempted suicide, to come to terms with their past. Again, the novel was made into a film of the same name in 1991.

In 1995, Conroy published Beach Music, a novel about an American expatriate living in Rome who returns to South Carolina upon news of his mother's terminal illness. The story reveals his attempt to confront personal demons, including the suicide of his wife, the subsequent custody battle with his in-laws over their daughter, and the attempt by a film-making friend to rekindle old friendships which were compromised during the days of the Vietnam War.

In 2002, Pat Conroy published My Losing Season where he takes the reader through his last year playing basketball, as point guard and captain of the Citadel Bulldogs. The Pat Conroy Cookbook, published in 2004, is a collection of favorite recipes accompanied by stories about his life, including many stories of growing up in South Carolina. In 2009, Conroy published South of Broad, which again uses the familiar backdrop of Charleston following the suicide of newspaperman Leo King's brother, and alternates narratives of a diverse group of friends between 1969 and 1989.

In May 2013, Conroy was named editor-at-large of Story River Books, a newly created fiction division of the University of South Carolina Press. In October 2013, four years after being first publicized, Conroy published a memoir called The Death of Santini, which recounts the volatile relationship he shared with his father up until his father's death in 1998.

Conroy was inducted into the South Carolina Hall of Fame on March 18, 2009.

Military brat cultural identity and awareness movement
Conroy was a major supporter of the research and writing efforts of journalist Mary Edwards Wertsch in her identification of the hidden subculture of American Military Brats, the children of career military families, who grow up moving constantly, deeply immersed in the military, and often personally affected by war.

Conroy's essay on military childhood 
In 1991, Wertsch "launched the movement for military brat cultural identity" with her book Military Brats: Legacies of Childhood inside the Fortress. In researching her book, Wertsch identified common themes from interviews of over 80 offspring of military households, including the special challenges, strengths and also the unique subculture experienced by American "military brats". While this book does not purport to be a scientific study, subsequent research has validated many of her findings.

Conroy contributed a now widely circulated ten-page essay on American military childhood, including his own childhood, to Wertsch's book, which was used as the introduction. It included the following:

Conroy's role in Brats: Our Journey Home
Conroy also authorized the use of his work in the award-winning documentary Brats: Our Journey Home directed by Donna Musil, that endeavors to bring the hidden subculture of military brats into greater public awareness, as well as aiding military brat self-awareness and support.

The documentary ends with a quote of Conroy about the invisibility of the military brat subculture to the wider American society. Conroy wrote, "We spent our entire childhoods in the service of our country, and no one even knew we were there."

Personal life
Conroy was married three times. His first marriage was to Barbara (née Bolling) Jones on October 10, 1969, while he was teaching on Daufuskie Island. Jones, who had been Conroy's next door neighbor in Beaufort, South Carolina, had been widowed when her first husband, Joseph Wester Jones III, a fighter pilot stationed in Vietnam, had been shot down and killed. Jones already had one daughter, Jessica, and was pregnant at the time of her husband's death with their second child, Melissa. He adopted both girls after he married their mother, and then they had a daughter of their own, Megan. They divorced in 1977.

Conroy then married Lenore (née Gurewitz) Fleischer in 1981. He became the stepfather to her two children, Gregory and Emily, and the couple also had one daughter, to whom he dedicated his 2010 book My Reading Life, "This book is dedicated to my lost daughter, Susannah Ansley Conroy. Know this: I love you with my heart and always will. Your return to my life would be one of the happiest moments I could imagine." Conroy and Fleischer divorced on October 26, 1995, Conroy's 50th birthday. Conroy married his third wife, writer Cassandra King, in May 1998.

A friend of Conroy, political cartoonist Doug Marlette, died in a car accident in July 2007. Conroy and Joe Klein eulogized Marlette at the funeral. There were 10 eulogists in all, and Conroy called Marlette his best friend,  and said: "The first person to cry, when he heard about Doug's death, was God".

Conroy lived in Beaufort with wife Cassandra until his death. In 2007, he commented that she was a much happier writer than he was: "I'll hear her cackle with laughter at some funny line she's written. I've never cackled with laughter at a single line I've ever written. None of it has given me pleasure. She writes with pleasure and joy, and I sit there in gloom and darkness."

As an adult, Conroy suffered from depression, had several breakdowns and contemplated suicide. He attempted suicide in the mid-1970s while writing The Great Santini.

Death
On February 15, 2016, Conroy stated on his Facebook page that he was being treated for pancreatic cancer. He died on March 4, 2016, at 70 years old. Conroy's funeral was held on March 8, 2016, at St. Peter's Catholic Church in Beaufort, South Carolina.

Pat Conroy is buried in St. Helena Memorial Gardens cemetery (Ernest Drive, Saint Helena Island 29920) near the Penn Center. The Penn Center is a National Historic Landmark that provided educational facilities to freed Gullah slaves after the Civil War and continues to serve as an African-American cultural and educational center.

Legacy

Located in Beaufort, South Carolina, the Pat Conroy Literary Center was incorporated as a non-profit 501(c)(3) organization on March 19, 2016. The center, which houses a collection of Conroy memorabilia, seeks to "continue his legacy in the magnificent coastal landscape where his storytelling began and beyond, supporting a vibrant literary community that reflects Pat Conroy’s undying delight in the power of the human voice." In 2017, the Pat Conroy Literary Center was designated a Literary Landmark by the American Library Association. The same year, it became the first site in South Carolina to be selected as an affiliate of the American Writers Museum.

The Pat Conroy Literary Center hosts a number of educational activities and cultural events, including an annual literary festival.

The Citadel in 2018 announced the Pat Conroy Writer’s Residency Fellowship to be given to a Bulldogs basketball player each season each year.

Works
1970: The Boo
1972: The Water Is Wide
1976: The Great Santini
1980: The Lords of Discipline
1986: The Prince of Tides
1989: Unconquered (teleplay)
1992:  (Introduction to book, "Military Brats: Legacies of Growing Up Inside the Fortress")
1995: Beach Music
2002: My Losing Season
2003: Unrooted Childhoods: Memoirs of Growing Up Global (contributing author)
2004: The Pat Conroy Cookbook: Recipes of My Life
2009: South of Broad
2010: My Reading Life
2013: The Death of Santini
2016: A Lowcountry Heart: Reflections on a Writing Life

Awards
 1973 Anisfield-Wolf Book Award 
 1974 National Education Association Humanitarian Award 
 1978 Georgia Governor's Award for the Arts & Humanities
 1981 Southern Regional Council Lillian Smith Book Award
 1988 South Carolina Academy of Authors Inductee
 1991 Writers Guild of America Award Nominee, Adapted Screenplay
 1992 Academy Award Nominee, Adapted Screenplay
 1992 University of Southern California Scripter Award Nominee
 1993 American Academy of Achievement Golden Plate Award
 1995 Thomas Cooper Medal for Distinction in the Arts & Sciences
 1996 Georgia Commission on the Holocaust Humanitarian Award
 1997 Omicron Delta Kappa honoris causa inductee at Auburn University at Montgomery
 1997 University of South Carolina Honorary Doctorate
 1999 Georgia Center for the Book Stanley W. Lindberg Award
 2000 The Citadel Honorary Doctor of Letters
 2001 James Beard Foundation Award for Journalism, Magazine Feature Writing with Recipes
 2002 South Carolina Order of the Palmetto 
 2003 Thomas Wolfe Prize, University of North Carolina at Chapel Hill Department of English 
 2003 Southern Independent Booksellers Alliance (SIBA) Book of the Year Award
 2004 Georgia Writers Hall of Fame Inductee
 2005 F. Scott Fitzgerald Award 
 2006 Southeastern Library Association Outstanding Southeastern Author Award 
 2010 South Carolina Hall of Fame Inductee 
 2010 Elizabeth O’Neill Verner Governor's Lifetime Achievement Award for the Arts 
 2014 Beaufort Regional Chamber of Commerce Palmetto Achievement Award

See also
Inspirational/motivational instructors/mentors portrayed in films
Conrack
The Water Is Wide
List of awards named after people

References

External links
 
 Pat Conroy Literary Center
 Pat Conroy Archive at the University of South Carolina
 Pat Conroy archive at the University of South Carolina Irvin Department of Rare Books and Special Collections.
 Edwin C. Epps collection of Pat Conroy at the University of South Carolina Irvin Department of Rare Books and Special Collections.
 Entry in New Georgia Encyclopedia
 
 

1945 births
2016 deaths
Gonzaga College High School alumni
The Citadel Bulldogs baseball players
The Citadel Bulldogs basketball players
Deaths from pancreatic cancer
Deaths from cancer in South Carolina
Writers from Atlanta
Novelists from South Carolina
Writers of American Southern literature
21st-century American novelists
American male novelists
21st-century American male writers
Novelists from Georgia (U.S. state)
American men's basketball players